Sizwe Moeketsi Moniker (born ), is a South African rapper commonly known as Reason (and now known as Sizwe Alakine after pursuing Amapiano career), he came to prominence after his collaborative work with Ms Nthabi. He has worked with some of South Africa's respected names such as Stogie T, Moneoa, ProVerb, DJ Maphorisa, Kwesta and HHP just to mention a few.

Discography 

 The Reasoning (2010)

 Audio 3D (2012)
 Audio High Definition (2014)
 Audio Re-Definition (Reason Season) (2015)
 Love Girls (2017)
 Azania (2018)

Awards and nominations

References

External links
 

1987 births
Living people
Amapiano musicians
South African record producers
South African musicians
People from Katlehong
South African rappers
Sotho people
21st-century rappers
21st-century South African musicians